Impatiens letouzeyi is a species of flowering plant in the family Balsaminaceae. It is endemic to Cameroon, where it occurs in the Bakossi Mountains. It grows as an epiphyte in trees and shrubs, as well as a terrestrial herb. It is threatened by plans for the construction of a reservoir in the area.

Sources

Endemic flora of Cameroon
letouzeyi
Endangered plants
Plants described in 1981
Taxonomy articles created by Polbot